Patrick Dermott Crofton (29 May 1935 – 5 January 2016) was a Canadian politician, businessman and farmer. Crofton served as a Progressive Conservative party member of the House of Commons of Canada.

Crofton was first elected at the riding of Esquimalt—Saanich and served in the 33rd Canadian Parliament. In the 1988 federal election, following changes to riding boundaries, he was defeated at the Saanich—Gulf Islands riding by Lynn Hunter of the New Democratic Party. He died in 2016 at the age of 80.

References

External links
 

1935 births
2016 deaths
Members of the House of Commons of Canada from British Columbia
Progressive Conservative Party of Canada MPs
People from the Capital Regional District